Parliamentary elections were held in Portugal on 11 September 1864.

Results

References

1864
1864 elections in Europe
1864 in Portugal
September 1864 events